1992 London bombing may refer to:

Baltic Exchange bombing
1992 London Bridge bombing
Sussex Arms bombing
1992 Staples Corner bombing
December 1992 Wood Green bombing
December 1992 West End bombs